The Stele Forest or Beilin Museum is a museum for steles and stone sculptures in Beilin District in Xi'an, Northwest China. The museum, which is housed in a former Confucian Temple, has housed a growing collection of Steles since 1087.  By 1944 it was the principal museum for Shaanxi province. Due to the large number of steles, it was officially renamed the Forest of Stone Steles in 1992. Altogether, there are 3,000 steles in the museum, which is divided into seven exhibitions halls, which mainly display works of Chinese calligraphy, painting and historical records.

History
The Stele Forest began with the Kaicheng Shi Jing Steles and Shitai Xiao Jing Steles, two groups of steles both carved in the Tang dynasty and displayed in the temple to Confucius and the Imperial College in Chang'an, capital of the empire. In 904, a rebel army sacked Chang'an, and the steles were evacuated to the inner city. In 962, they were returned to the rebuilt temple. In the Song dynasty, a special hall with attached facilities was built to house and display the two stele groups. It was damaged in the 1556 Shaanxi earthquake during the Ming dynasty. In 1936, famous Chinese calligrapher Yu Youren donated his entire collection of more than three hundred rubbings from steles to the Xian Forest of Stele Museum. It became a Major Historical and Cultural Site Protected at the National Level in 1961 and thus survived the Cultural Revolution.

Steles

It houses nearly 3,000 steles and it is the biggest collection of steles in China. Most of its exhibits are steles of the Tang dynasty. Ink rubbings of the steles are available for sale.

Among the unusual examples is an 18th-century stele depicting a Yangtze River flood control project. Another appears to be a bamboo forest, but on examination the leaves and branches form a poem.

The famous Xi'an Stele was moved to the Stele Forest in 1907, after the local authorities learned that the Danish adventurer Frits Holm was in town, trying to "obtain" the ancient monument and take it out of the country.
 Cao Quan Stele (曹全碑, Han Dynasty)
 Sima Fang Stele (司马芳碑, Jin Dynasty)
 Kaicheng Shi Jing Stele (开成石经碑, Tang Dynasty)
 Xi'anorian Stele (大秦景教流行中国碑, Tang Dynasty)

Stone sculptures
 Four Steeds of Zhao Mausoleum (Tang Dynasty)
The collections of the Beilin Museum are far more extensive than suggested by this inadequate thumbnail stub. To give but one example, artefacts produced by the ancient buddhasasansangha of part of China are well represented: Buddhist Sculpture from China: Selections from the X'ian Beilin Museum Fifth through Ninthh Centuries (China Institute Gallery, New York, 2007).

References

External links

  Xi'an Stele
 Xi'an Stele Forest Museum

Chinese steles
Museums in Shaanxi
Buildings and structures in Xi'an
Major National Historical and Cultural Sites in Shaanxi
Confucian temples in China